Ceaux-en-Loudun is a commune in the Vienne department in the Nouvelle-Aquitaine region in western France.

Its inhabitants are called Ceauxois (male) and Ceauxoises (female) or Ceaussois (male) and Ceaussoises (female).

Demographics

See also
Communes of the Vienne department

References

Communes of Vienne